Royal Blues is the fourth studio album by Canadian electronic music band Dragonette, released on November 18, 2016 by their independent record label. The album received minor success in Canada, peaking at 100 on the Canadian Albums Chart in December 2016. Royal Blues features production collaborations with musicians such as Matt Schwartz, xSDTRK, Mike Mago, Davey Badiuk, and Sam Willows.

Track listing

Charts

References

2016 albums
Dragonette albums